Deckenpfronn is a municipality in the district of Böblingen in Baden-Württemberg in Germany.

North of Deckenpfronn on the Lerchenberg is the radio transmitter site of the Karlsruhe police, which includes an 81-metre-high transmission tower.

Population

 1900: 1.178
 1950: 1.003
 1987: 2.074
 2005: 2.929 
 2010: 3.168 
 2015: 3.306

References

Böblingen (district)
Württemberg